Black Mamba Boy is a 2010 novel by the Somali-British author Nadifa Mohamed.

Overview
Black Mamba Boy (2010) is a semi-autobiographical account of Nadifa's father's life in Yemen in the 1930s and 40s, during the colonial period. It also recounts his trek through Sudan, Egypt, Palestine and the Mediterranean, before eventually settling in the United Kingdom.

The "Black Mamba" reference in its title is an allusion to the black mamba snake. According to the author:

"When my grandmother was heavily pregnant with my father, she was following her family’s caravan and she got lost and separated from the others. She sat down to rest under an acacia tree and a black mamba snake crept upon her belly before slithering away, leaving her unharmed. She took this as a sign that the child she carried would always be protected, and that’s how the title of the book came about."

Awards
The novel won the 2010 Betty Trask Award, and was short-listed for numerous awards, including the 2010 Guardian First Book Award, the 2010 Dylan Thomas Prize, and the 2010 John Llewellyn Rhys Prize. The book was also long-listed for the 2010 Orange Prize for Fiction.

References

External links
Black Mamba Boy at WorldCat

2010 British novels
Novels set in the 1930s
Novels set in the 1940s
Novels set in Sudan
Novels set in the Middle East
Novels set in Egypt
Novels set in Mandatory Palestine
2010 debut novels
HarperCollins books